Aalappirandhavan is a 1987 Tamil-language action film, written and directed by A. S. Prakasam. It stars Sathyaraj and Ambika.

Plot 

Aalappirandhavan has then extraordinary power of appearing at the spot instantaneously where crimes occur and save the good people by punishing the bad elements. The actress Ambika falls for his heroism.

Cast

Soundtrack 
Soundtrack was written and composed by Ilaiyaraaja.

Release and reception 
Aalappirandhavan was released on 10 April 1987. The Indian Express said, "With an offbeat storyline that anyhow paves the way only for bloody violence — so common this line of approach has become that even a child would refuse to be impressed — college professor turned filmmaker A. S. Pragasam deserves a pat for attempting to develop on a fresh idea, but his jerky and inane narrative falls between the two stolls of reality and fantasy and sinks in the morass of sheer incapacity."

References

External links 
 Aalapiranthavan at Cinesouth.com

1987 films
Films scored by Ilaiyaraaja
1980s Tamil-language films
Indian action films